C. rubra  may refer to:

 Canna rubra, a garden plant
 Cephalanthera rubra, the red helleborine, an orchid species found in Europe, north Africa and parts of Asia
 Chionochloa rubra, the red tussock, a plant species endemic to New Zealand
 Clathrina rubra, a sponge species
 Claytonia rubra, the redstem springbeauty, a wildflower species
 Crax rubra, the great curassow, a large black pheasant-like bird species

See also
 Rubra (disambiguation)